On the morning of 7 October 2018, a Palestinian gunman opened fire on several Israelis in the Barkan Industrial Park, killing two Israelis and critically injuring another. The shooting incident was declared a "terrorist attack" by the IDF. It was the first attack in the park and the second fatal attack in the West Bank to occur in three weeks.

A 23-year-old Palestinian, had worked in a factory where the shooting took place.

IDF forces conducted an intensive two-month manhunt to capture the militant who fled the scene.
The IDF arrested some relatives of the assailant.

Reactions 
Israeli Prime Minister Benjamin Netanyahu declared the shooting "a very severe terror attack".

Manhunt for shooter ends in his death 
The two-months long search for the shooter ended on 12 December when his hiding place was discovered by Israeli security.  He shot at the arresting officers who returned fire, killing him. The militant was killed on 13 December 2018 after an armed clash with a special IDF force called Yamam in the Askar refugee camp in Nablus.

The shooter, Ashraf Naalwa, 23, from the West Bank village of Shuweika near Tulkarem, was said by security officials to have been planning a new attack at the time he was found and killed.

The IDF ordered the demolition of Naalwa's home.

References

Terrorist incidents in the West Bank in 2018
Terrorist incidents in Asia in 2018
October 2018 crimes in Asia
2018 murders in Asia
Palestinian terrorism
October 2018 events in Asia